Leadec provides technical services for the automotive and manufacturing industries. The company, which is headquartered in Stuttgart, employs around 20,000 people worldwide. Leadec deploys permanent teams in the facilities and plants of its customers but also has its own operations at more than 200 locations. It has received awards from its customers for the quality of its services and its occupational safety standards.

In 2021, the Leadec Group had combined earnings of more than EUR 940 million.

Board of Management
Markus Glaser-Gallion has been CEO of the Leadec Group since 1 September 2016.

Christian Geißler has been a member of the Board of Management of the Leadec Group since 1 September 2016. As CFO he is responsible for finance and controlling.

Markus Hucko, COO, has been a member of the Board of Management of the Leadec Group since May 2017 and is responsible for IT / Systems & Operations.

Martin Kuhnhen has been a member of the Leadec Group Management Board as CSO since March 2022.

History
Leadec originated in 1962, with the establishment of boiler cleaning company Reichenberger & Co. In the 1960s, the company began to provide a new kind of service: the outsourced maintenance of machines and facilities. The company was renamed Deutsche Industriewartung GmbH, Reichenberger & Co., and from 1985 operated under the name Deutsche Industriewartung GmbH & Co. KG (DIW).

In 1986 Salamander and Voith acquired DIW, which became the Group Division Voith Industrial Services in October 2000. Voith Industrial Services acquired a stake in Hörmann Industrietechnik in October 2000. Voith Servicos Industriais do Brasil Ltda. was established in 2004. In 2005 the company acquired the American Premier Group. In 2006 it acquired a majority stake in Hörmann Industrietechnik, a specialist in technical industrial services mainly for the automotive industry.

Helix Systems Inc., which has a workforce of 260 and sales of US$30 million, became part of Voith Industrial Services in August 2014. In September 2014, Voith Industrial Services sold its subsidiary DIW.

In May 2016 Voith and Triton signed an agreement on the planned sale of the Voith Industrial Services Division. The sale to Triton was completed in September 2016. The new Leadec brand was announced on 23 January 2017. The new name, "Leadec", is derived from the English words "lead" (leading edge, leadership) and "tech" (technology).

References 

Companies based in Baden-Württemberg
Companies based in Stuttgart